Jat Assembly constituency is one of the 288 Vidhan Sabha (legislative assembly) constituencies of Maharashtra state in western India.

Overview
Jat constituency is one of the eight Vidhan Sabha constituencies located in the Sangli district.

Jat is part of the Sangli Lok Sabha constituency along with five other Vidhan Sabha segments in this district, namely Miraj, Sangli, Palus-Kadegaon, Tasgao-Kavathemahakal and Khanapur.

Members of Legislative Assembly
Bombay State:
 1952: Vijayasinharao Ramrao Daflle, Independent (politician)

Maharashtra State:
 1978: Sohani Jayant Ishwar, Indian National Congress
 1980: Sohani Jayant Ishwar, Indian National Congress
 1985: Sanamadikar Umaji Dhanapa, Indian National Congress
 1990: Sanamadikar Umaji Dhanapa, Independent (politician)
 1995: Kamble Madhukar Shankar, Independent (politician)
 1999: Sanamadikar Umaji Dhannapa, Indian National Congress
 2004: Khade Suresh(BHAU)DAGADU, Bharatiya Janata Party
 2009: Prakash (ANNA)SHIVAJIRAO SHENDAGE, Bharatiya Janata Party
 2014: Vilasrao Narayan Jagtap, Bharatiya Janata Party
 2019: Vikramsinh Balasaheb Sawant, Indian National Congress

Election results

Maharashtra Assembly Elections 2004

Maharashtra Assembly Elections 2009

Maharashtra Assembly Elections 2014

Maharashtra Assembly Elections 2019

See also
 List of constituencies of Maharashtra Vidhan Sabha

References

Assembly constituencies of Maharashtra
Sangli district